Horse logging is the use of horses or mules in forestry. In the modern industrialized world, it is often part of sustainable forest management.

Horses may be used for skidding and other tasks.

Net  net and gross production rates using horse logging in a Romanian study were of 2.63 m3/h and 1.44 m3/h.

In the United Kingdom, there were three people employed as horse loggers in the 1980s but the number increased to 15 by 2009 with up to 1,000 part-time employed by that work.

Horses can efficiently extract a single damaged tree from a forest without roadbuilding required for powered vehicles. The technique can be more efficient than using power equipment, considering the cost of transportation and fuel, especially on smaller privately held forest parcels.

Equipment
logging arch

Michigan logging wheels

go-devil
a simple, loosely articulated sled without thills (shafts) or a tongue generally used for skidding long logs behind a horse

scoot
a heavy sled on which logs or bolts are carried completely off the ground in several different sizes, depending on the pulling power to be used, ranging from a horse to a heavy tractor

skidding harness
a specialized harness to allow the animal to drag logs

whiffletree
often used when horse skidding to keep the trace chains away from the horses' heels

See also 
 Skidder

References

Sources

 also "Antifriction devices for skidding: pp 23-25

Further reading

External links

Horse logging at heavyhorses.net

Log transport
Logging